Max Peter Bejmer (born 3 June 1992) is a Swedish orienteering competitor and world champion. He won a gold medal in the mixed sprint relay at the 2022 World Orienteering Championships.

Bejmer represents IFK Göteborg Orientering.

References

External links

1992 births
Living people
Swedish orienteers
Male orienteers
Foot orienteers
World Orienteering Championships medalists